Mölschow is a municipality in the Vorpommern-Greifswald district, in Mecklenburg-Vorpommern, Germany. It consists of
 Bannemin
 Mölschow
 Zecherin

References

Vorpommern-Greifswald